In German-speaking countries, the term Landsturm was historically used to refer to militia or military units composed of troops of inferior quality. It is particularly associated with Prussia, Germany, Austria-Hungary, Sweden and the Netherlands.

Austria-Hungary 

The Austro-Hungarian Landsturm was a reserve force that consisted of men aged 34 to 55. It was intended to provide replacements for the front line units and provide a militia for local defense. It was divided into the Austrian Imperial  (Kaiserlich) Landsturm and the Hungarian Royal (Königlich) Népfelkelés.

During the First World War, the Austrian Landsturm formed 40 regiments totaling 136 battalions in Austria and the Hungarian Landsturm formed 32 regiments totaling 97 battalions. They provided 20 Brigades who took to the field with the rest of the army.

Germany

Prussia from 1813 
It effectively formed the last national military reserve.

The 1813 edict called for heroic resistance by any means against the Napoleonic invasion. As a model and an explicit example, it took the Spanish Reglamento de Partidas y Cuadrillas of 28 December 1808 and the decree of 17 April 1809, known as Corso Terrestre, during the Peninsula War against Napoleonic troops (ref. the introduction, §8, §52).

According to this edict, all Prussian citizens were obliged to oppose the invasion by the enemy using any weapons available, like axes, pitchforks, scythes or shotguns (§43). All Prussians were further encouraged to not obey orders by the enemy, but rather to make themselves a nuisance to the Napoleonic troops however possible. This was a clear departure from ordinary jus in bello (Latin for Law of War), which commanded the civilian population to obey the orders of the occupying power, and the police forces to assist the occupying power in crushing any uprising. It did not qualify as an insurgency, but simply as criminal activity. The Landsturm edict explicitly stated that it was preferable to risk the danger brought about by the furies of an armed population rather than to let the enemy have control over the situation. Légitime défense "justified the use of all means" (§7), including chaos.

The edict was modified less than three months later on 17 July 1813 and was purified of its subversive content relative to the laws of war. The war then took place according to the standard rules of conventional warfare. Carl Schmitt qualified it as the "Magna Carta of the partisan". Despite its not being put to practice, fascist jurists considered it in a 1962 lecture in Francoist Spain to be the "official document of the legitimation of the partisan of national defense" and as the "philosophical discovery of the partisan."

North German Confederation from 1867 
The North German Confederation Act of 9 November 1867 about the obligation for wartime military service and the Reich law about the Landsturm of 12 February 1875 restricted the obligation to the period from 17 to 42 years of age.

Bavaria from 1868
In the Bavarian Army the oldest ages for compulsory military service since the army reform of 1868 was referred to as the Landsturm.

Sweden 

In February 1808, Russia invaded Swedish Finland and on 14 March Denmark-Norway declared war on Sweden, starting the Finnish War. On the very same day of the Danish declaration of war, Gustav IV Adolf, the Swedish king, issue a decree that ordered the formation of a new military unit, called Lantvärnet, which is the Swedish name for landwehr. The decree stated that all able unmarried men between 18 and 25 would become eligible to be conscripted for service in lantvärnet. The plan was that lantvärnet would consist of 60,000 men, almost at par with the standing army that numbered 66,000 men. However, in reality, lantvärnet consisted of only circa 30,000 men. The soldiers of lantvärnet were poorly equipped and they only received their pay on an irregular basis. This led to low morale amongst the men. After the war had ended the common people had a very negative view on lantvärnet and conscription. Lantvärnet was abolished in 1811. Some believe that the popular resistance against conscription caused by the negative experiences of lantvärnet lived on for many years and was one of the main causes that Sweden did not reintroduce conscription until 1901.

In 1885, the Swedish parliament passed a law that formed Landstormen. All able Swedish males between 27 and 32 would serve in landstormen as a territorial defence force in case of war. Landstormen however then only existed in theory and lacked any organization; only in the case of war were the Swedish Army to prepare plans and organizations for the landstorm. In 1892 the law was changed, and all men between 33 and 40 would serve in Landstormen in case of war. In 1901 Sweden introduced conscription, and became a proper second line unit, organizing the elder conscripted men (those between 33 and 40), and were tasked with territorial defence as well as securing the mobilization of the field army. In 1914 the law was changed and landstormen was to organize all men between 35 and 42. Also a mandatory 5 days refresher training was mandated for all those that belonged to landstormen. During World War I, Landstormen was frequently mobilized to secure the Swedish neutrality.

Landstormen was again mobilized during World War II. In 1942 the Swedish Army went through a major re-organization and landstormen was abolished and incorporated into the regular army.

Switzerland 
In the Swiss Army, the Landsturm was, until 1995, the third age class (men from 42–50) after the Elite (men from 18–32) and the Landwehr (men from 32–42).

See also
34th SS Volunteer Grenadier Division Landstorm Nederland, Dutch SS Volunteer organization in WW2
Corso Terrestre (see Francisco Javier Mina Larrea and Francisco Espoz y Mina, guerrilleros of the Peninsula War)
Home Guard
Irregular warfare 
Law of war
Levée en masse
Militia
Volkssturm

References

Military units and formations of Germany
Military history of Germany
Law of war